Fusako Masuda (born January 18, 1968) is a retired female race walker from Japan.

Achievements

References

1968 births
Living people
Japanese female racewalkers
Asian Games medalists in athletics (track and field)
Athletes (track and field) at the 1990 Asian Games
Asian Games bronze medalists for Japan
Medalists at the 1990 Asian Games